Christopher Robert Badcock (born 1946) is a British sociologist and Emeritus Reader in Sociology at the London School of Economics, from which he retired in 2011. He received his PhD from the London School of Economics in 1973 under the supervision of Ernest Gellner. His thesis, and his early work thereafter, focused on the work of Claude Levi-Strauss. He served as a lecturer in sociology at Polytechnic of the South Bank from 1969 to 1973, and was on the faculty in the Sociology Department at the London School of Economics from 1974 until his retirement. He is known for working with Bernard Crespi to develop the imprinted brain hypothesis, according to which autism results from "a paternal bias in the expression of imprinted genes", whereas psychosis results from a maternal and/or X-chromosome bias in the expression of such genes.

References

Living people
1946 births
British sociologists
People educated at Maidstone Grammar School
Alumni of the London School of Economics
Academics of London South Bank University
Academics of the London School of Economics
Autism researchers